Shaunna O'Connell is an American politician from Taunton, Massachusetts. A Republican, she currently serves as the 51st Mayor of Taunton, having served in office since January 2020. O’Connell was previously a member of the Massachusetts House of Representatives, serving in that office from 2011 until 2020 and representing the Third Bristol District.

Early life and education
O'Connell grew up in Taunton to divorced parents who ended up on housing assistance to meet family expenses. She worked her way through college by working two jobs. She worked in the food service department of the Morton Hospital and Medical Center, working her way up to a supervisory position.

O'Connell attended the Massachusetts Bay Community College (Wellesley, Massachusetts) and Massasoit Community College (Brockton, Massachusetts).

Political career 
O'Connell launched her first State Representative campaign against incumbent Democratic State Representative James Fagan in June 2009, citing comments Fagan made in 2008 during a debate on a child sexual assault bill as her inspiration to run. She defeated Fagan in the 2010 General Election by 44 votes on election day, prompting a recount. She held on in the recount, with her margin of victory narrowing by only 13 votes and winning by 31 votes.

O'Connell won re-election in 2012, 2014, 2016, and 2018, facing a Democratic opponent in each election. In 2019, O'Connell ran for Mayor of Taunton and won, becoming the 50th Mayor and first female Mayor in Taunton's history. She faced controversy at the start of her mayoral campaign, with CommonWealth Magazine reporting that Massachusetts Lieutenant Governor Karyn Polito had given O'Connell notice that incumbent Taunton Mayor Thomas Hoye would not run for re-election.

References

1970 births
Republican Party members of the Massachusetts House of Representatives
Politicians from Taunton, Massachusetts
Women state legislators in Massachusetts
Living people
21st-century American politicians
21st-century American women politicians
Mayors of Taunton, Massachusetts
Women mayors of places in Massachusetts